Dmitri Igorevich Kirillov (born 16 June 1998) is a Russian football player. He plays for FC Znamya Truda Orekhovo-Zuyevo.

Club career
He made his debut in the Russian Football National League for FC Zenit-2 Saint Petersburg on 8 July 2017 in a game against FC Shinnik Yaroslavl.

References

External links
 Profile by Russian Football National League

1998 births
Sportspeople from Tver
Living people
Russian footballers
Russia youth international footballers
Association football midfielders
FC Zenit-2 Saint Petersburg players
FC Znamya Truda Orekhovo-Zuyevo players
Russian First League players